The Algerian gerbil (Gerbillus garamantis) is a species of rodent distributed mainly in Algeria. It is sometimes considered a subspecies of the dwarf gerbil.

References

Gerbillus
Rodents of North Africa
Mammals described in 1881
Endemic fauna of Algeria